FCR may refer to:

Science and medicine 
 Fc receptor
 Fire-cracked rock
 Flexor carpi radialis muscle
 Folin–Ciocalteu reagent
Fuji computed radiography, name of a series of computed radiography systems made by Fujifilm

Sport 
 FCR 2001 Duisburg, a German football club
 FC Rauma, a Finnish football club
 FC Remscheid, a German football club
 FC Rosengård, a Swedish football club
 FC Roskilde, a Danish football club
 FC Rouen, a French football club
 Fog City Rollers, a Canadian roller derby league
 Frank Cicci Racing, a NASCAR team

Other uses 
 Fairy Chess Review, a defunct chess periodical
 False coverage rate
 FCR (company), an American call center
 Federal Court Reports, law reports covering the Federal Court of Australia
 Feed conversion ratio
 Fifth Colvmn Records, a defunct American record label
 Financial condition report
 Fire-control radar
 First Call Resolution
 Flat-Coated Retriever, a breed of dog
 Flying Carpet (airline), now Med Airways
 Frontier Crimes Regulations in Pakistan
 Fulton County Railway, an American railway company